Rigsalimi (also Romanized as Rīgsalīmī; also known as Rīgsalmī) is a village in Sorkh Qaleh Rural District, in the Central District of Qaleh Ganj County, Kerman Province, Iran. According to the 2006 census, the villages population was 597, in 108 families.

References 

Populated places in Qaleh Ganj County